Raymond Roberts (August 25, 1895 – January 30, 1962), was a Major League Baseball pitcher who played from  – 1928 with the Philadelphia Athletics, and many other minor, and major league franchises. He started his baseball career in Atlanta with the Crackers following serving in World War I. He batted left and threw right-handed.

He was born and died in Cruger, Mississippi.

External links

1895 births
1962 deaths
Major League Baseball pitchers
Baseball players from Mississippi
Philadelphia Athletics players
Mississippi State Bulldogs baseball players
People from Holmes County, Mississippi